Mathematics and Plausible Reasoning  is a two-volume book by the mathematician George Pólya describing various methods for being a good guesser of new mathematical results. In the Preface to Volume 1 of the book Pólya exhorts all interested students of mathematics thus: "Certainly, let us learn proving, but also let us learn guessing." P. R. Halmos reviewing the book summarised the central thesis of the book thus: ". . . a good guess is as important as a good proof."

Outline

Volume I: Induction and analogy in mathematics
Polya begins Volume I with a discussion on induction, not mathematical induction, but as a way of guessing new results. He shows how the chance observations of a few results of the form 4 = 2 + 2, 6 = 3 + 3, 8 = 3 + 5, 10 = 3 + 7, etc., may prompt a sharp mind to formulate the conjecture that every even number greater than 4 can be represented as the sum of two odd prime numbers. This is the well known Goldbach's conjecture. The first problem in the first chapter is to guess the rule according to which the successive terms of the following sequence are chosen: 11, 31, 41, 61, 71, 101, 131, . . . In the next chapter the techniques of generalization, specialization and analogy are presented as possible strategies for plausible reasoning. In the remaining chapters, these ideas are illustrated by discussing the discovery of several results in  various fields of mathematics like number theory, geometry, etc. and also in physical sciences.

Volume II: Patterns of Plausible Inference

This volume attempts to formulate certain patterns of plausible reasoning. The relation of these patterns with the calculus of probability are also investigated. Their relation to mathematical invention and instruction are also discussed. The following are
some of the patterns of plausible inference discussed by Polya.

Reviews

References

Mathematics books
Reasoning
Inference